Gina Ravera is an American actress. She has appeared in the films Showgirls (1995), Soul Food (1997), Kiss the Girls (1997), and The Great Debaters (2007). She co-starred as detective Irene Daniels in the TNT crime drama series The Closer (2005-2009).

Life and career
Ravera was born in San Francisco, California. She is of mixed African-American and Puerto Rican heritage. She is a classically trained dancer.

In the early 1990s, Ravera began appearing in guest-starring roles on television shows, including The Fresh Prince of Bel-Air, Melrose Place, and Star Trek: The Next Generation. During 1993-94, she was a cast member of the CBS crime series Silk Stalkings. In films, she had a starring role in the 1995 erotic drama Showgirls, directed by Paul Verhoeven, and in 1997 appeared in the comedy-drama Soul Food. Ravera later went to television, appearing in TV films of the week and in series guest roles and regular roles. She was a regular cast member of Time of Your Life, a spin-off series of Fox's popular teen drama Party of Five, from 1999 to 2001.

From 2005 to 2009, Ravera played Irene Daniels during the first four seasons of the TNT crime drama series The Closer and was the only regular cast member to leave the series during its run. From 2006 to 2008, she also had a recurring role on ER and in 2007, she played Denzel Washington's wife in the biographical film The Great Debaters.

Filmography

Film and TV Movies

Television

Awards and nominations

References

External links

20th-century American actresses
21st-century American actresses
Actresses from California
American people of Puerto Rican descent
Living people
Actresses from San Francisco
American television actresses
African-American actresses
American film actresses
20th-century African-American women
20th-century African-American people
21st-century African-American women
21st-century African-American people
Year of birth missing (living people)